The Mercurial Vapor is a football boot manufactured by Nike. The boot is known for being lightweight and has been endorsed by players such as Cristiano Ronaldo, Kylian Mbappé, Eden Hazard, Raheem Sterling, Zlatan Ibrahimović, Didier Drogba, Luka Modrić, Arturo Vidal, Douglas Costa, Xherdan Shaqiri, Stephan El Shaarawy, Alexis Sánchez, Philippe Coutinho and many more.

History

Background
The origin of the Mercurial Vapors can be traced back to 1998, when Ronaldo debuted the original Nike Air Mercurial boots. The boots were originally released in black, but a version in silver/blue/yellow was released for the 1998 World Cup and a blue/black version followed soon after. All boots were made in Soft Ground (SG) and Firm Ground (FG) varieties, with the SG version using non-removable studs. In 1999, the Mercurial 2 was released in two colourways, black/blue and black/red. These were identical in shape, size and fit to the originals, but they had a different insole and a smaller Nike "swoosh" symbol on the side of the boot. The Mercurials were Nike's first boots to be made using synthetic materials, and also their first venture into the market of lightweight boots designed for speed.

First Mercurial line
In 1998, Nike launched the first "Mercurial" football boot –the R9– a shoe inspired by and designed for Brazilian star Ronaldo, which he debuted at the 1998 FIFA World Cup. The boot is in its fourteenth version, the Nike Mercurial Vapor 14.

The boot is available in either Soft Ground (SG; now Soft Ground Pro/SG-Pro), Firm Ground (FG) or Artificial Ground (AG) versions. The SG version's sole plate is fitted with six NikeSnap removable studs, which can be purchased in different lengths, for the first and second models, and traditional screw-in aluminium studs for versions 3 to 8; the FG version has seven moulded blades.

Mercurial Vapor

The original Vapors were released in mid-2002, just before the World Cup of that year. The first glimpse anyone outside of Nike had of the boots was in the Nike cage advert starring Eric Cantona, Thierry Henry and Roberto Carlos, in which a close-up shot of the boots is taken near the end of the advert. The boot was first released in three colourways: cinder/white/maize; University Blue/white/obsidian; and medium grey/ red. These three colourways were distinctive as they had limited heel cushioning and dimples on the inner heel cup for foot grip. This was upgraded for the remainder of the Vapor I line. A chrome/lime variation (worn exclusively by Ronaldo in the semi-finals and final) was released to the public in limited numbers (just 4,600, across FG, HG and SG variants; quantity split unknown) in the period after the tournament. Other colours included white/ice/black; chrome/black; black/chilli red; dark charcoal/surf blue/white; and shock orange/white. In addition to the NikeSkin Vapors, Nike released its first kangaroo leather version of the shoe in black/grey. The Vapors also continued with the R9 designation on boots that was featured originally in the previous Mercurial lines. Both chrome colourways featured the "R9" brand.

At the time of release, the Vapor was the lightest boot on the market with several key innovations. The upper was made of an extremely thin, lightweight synthetic known as Nike Skin. It was claimed to be thinner and stronger than any kangaroo leather. The Vapor also featured an external heel counter which was very uncommon at that time as well as a "glass" filled outsole called NikeFrame, inspired by track sprint spikes and designed to spring back into shape after push-off. According to the booklets inserted into the box with each pair, the shoe showed a 3% decrease in the time to cover a 20-metre sprint compared to other boots.

Mercurial Vapor II
The Mercurial Vapor II was released in January 2004 in two colourways: team red and photo blue. The photo blue boots were debuted by Ronaldo a month earlier, in Real Madrid's clash with Barcelona at the Camp Nou, whilst Thierry Henry debuted the red pair in Arsenal's 5–1 win over Internazionale in Milan, with Henry scoring two goals. The revised version of the boot differed from the original Vapors in three respects: first, the material from which the boot was constructed was made marginally thicker; second, a cushioned area around the ankle with a slightly larger heel tab was added midway through the MVII run (generally known as v2.1); and finally, the pattern down the sides of the boot was modified to make the indentations more pronounced, along with a thin coloured stripe to complement the colour of the boot. The boot still maintained the same upper material, sole plate, and external heel counter. The boot was also released in many other colourways, which included cinder/maize; mist blue/navy; gunmetal; orange blaze/black; navy/silver; gold/black; white/red; chrome/photo blue; chili red/silver; and the final colourway, aluminium/gold, was released as an homage to the colours of Real Madrid, which were to be worn by Ronaldo. Once again, Nike also released a kangaroo leather version, in a white/ black colourway. The photo blue, orange blaze, gold, aluminium and chrome colourways all sported the 'R9' brand.

Mercurial Vapor III
The MVIII is the third generation in the Mercurial Vapor family and was released in 2006. It featured Teijin microfibres which conform to the foot and are lightweight and durable. The boot itself weighed only . It also has a carbon last to give support to the heel and more padding was added to the heel cup area. The original MVIIIs were released in a white/gold colourway, which was followed by sport red/white; silver/yellow; platinum/red; deep royal; dark charcoal/gold; ignite (a yellow/green combination); white/silver; and blue graphite/sonic yellow. A limited edition boot was released to commemorate Italy's fourth World Cup triumph in World Cup gold/Azzurri blue.

Towards the end of the 2006–07 season, further colourways were released, including obsidian/metallic platinum; metallic zinc/tart orange; cactus; silver/red; and argon blue.

On 13 September 2007, Nike released a limited edition tenth anniversary version of the Mercurial Vapor, featuring "all the modern technology from the current MVIII combined with the original Mercurial Upper design from 1998." These boots featured in an advert with the Brazilian star Ronaldo, where he reenacted many of his past goals, which he scored wearing the famous Mercurial Vapor boots.

Mercurial Vapor IV
In April 2007, some initial pictures of what were believed to be the new Mercurial Vapor boots were leaked onto the Internet. Not much could be ascertained from the pictures, but they did show that the MVIVs might have a cover over the laces in the same vein as the Adidas F50s. The Nike "swoosh" was also larger than on previous versions. Only two colourways were shown, those being orange peel/obsidian and anthracite/vivid blue. This boot weigh in about 210g (or 7.4oz). Later in the year, a limited edition version of the Mercurial SL was put up for sale online. Only 2,008 pairs were made available in Firm Ground and 500 pairs in Soft ground, costing £250 (€400/$600) each. This version of the boot is made almost entirely out of carbon fibre and weighs a mere . The shoe is made in one colour, black, with two pink "swooshes" on each boot.

In December 2007, a promotional video was released by Nike, featuring the former world record holder for the 100m sprint, Asafa Powell. In the video, Powell dons the Mercurial SL boots, and sprints the length of a football pitch in 9.94 seconds, before instructing the Nike representatives to "tell them they're fast." The Nike representatives are then seen taking the boots to a mansion in London, where Didier Drogba opens the door and is told, "They're fast."

One of the advertisements shows Cristiano Ronaldo appearing to outrun a Bugatti Veyron, allegedly the fastest car in the world, while wearing the Orange Peel/Obsidian versions of the Mercurial Vapor IV boots. The final "launch" advertisement for the boots show Aaron Lennon of Tottenham Hotspur and Gabriel Agbonlahor of Aston Villa go head-to-head on a 45-metre track where the speed was based on speed to the ball and speed with the ball.

A third colourway was revealed on the first weekend of March 2008. Cristiano Ronaldo wore them on 1 March 2008 in Manchester United's FA Cup exit against Portsmouth. This new colourway features a sport red outsole with a gold "swoosh." This new colourway was released on 7 April 2008.

The carbon fibre Mercurial SL boots were used in a professional match for the first time in the 2008 UEFA Champions League Final between Manchester United and Chelsea, when they were worn by Cristiano Ronaldo. Didier Drogba was also expected to wear them, but instead wore the black Mercurial Vapor IVs.

On 7 June 2008, a limited edition brown leather version of the Mercurial Vapors was released to coincide with the start of UEFA Euro 2008. A green and white colourway, as worn by Cristiano Ronaldo, was also unveiled on 7 June, and was released on for release on 24 July, as is a white and blue version.

The seventh colourway of the Mercurial Vapor IV was a marina/volt version, which was worn by Cristiano Ronaldo and Zlatan Ibrahimović.

On 24 November 2008, Nike released an eighth, limited edition pink colourway called Nike Mercurial Vapor IV Berry. Initial pictures of a pink colourway called Nike Vapor Rosa were leaked onto the Internet. A video of the Mercurial Rosa was released featuring a cartoon Franck Ribéry trying to outrun an abusive coach that resembles Pink Panther running away from the Inspector with the "Head to Toes" theme being played. A second video showed Ribery driving the Panthermobile (reenacts the intro of Pink Panther), going to a casino and the 1st cartoon.The 2 cartoons were called "Superlight, Supersonic! These were then backed up with a video from Nike, which stated "You better be quick," and featured players such as James Milner, Theo Walcott, Carlos Vela, Marlon Harewood and Cesc Fàbregas. Nicklas Bendtner debuted the boots when Arsenal faced Manchester City at the City of Manchester Stadium on 22 November 2008.

In early January 2009, Nike released the final two colourways for the Vapor IVs: citron/charcoal and charcoal/max orange. The citron colourway has been especially popular with professional players, and was worn by the likes of Cristiano Ronaldo and Zlatan Ibrahimović.

Mercurial Vapor V & Mercurial Vapor Superfly

The Nike Mercurial Vapor Superfly and Vapor V were the fifth incarnation of the Nike Mercurial line and the first of the Superfly line. The Mercurial Vapor Superfly marked the first time a boot was made using Nike Flywire technology, while the Vapor V followed the use of a lace cover like its immediate predecessor. The boot was launched by Cristiano Ronaldo at Old Trafford in Manchester on 26 February 2009. It was debuted during the 2008–09 UEFA Champions League knockout phase a match between Manchester United and Internazionale by Cristiano Ronaldo and Zlatan Ibrahimović. The following weekend, players across the world also debuted the boots (notably Robinho, Theo Walcott, Alexandre Pato and Dani Alves).

Both the Superfly and Vapor came in the original max orange/abyss/metallic platinum colourway as well as six others: black/voltage yellow/max orange; orion blue/metallic silver; platinum/max orange; vibrant yellow/black/midwest gold orange; white/pink flash/black/metallic silver; and abyss/white/max orange, which was not released in Superfly version.

Women's Mercurial Vapor
A women's version was released in April 2009, and is available in one colourway: white/metallic silver/max orange.

Mercurial Vapor VI and Mercurial Vapor Superfly II
The second release of the Superfly series was released on 24 February 2010 at a Nike Football event at the Battersea Power Station in London. Once again, Cristiano Ronaldo launched the boot first appearing in a violet poppy/obsidian/orange colourway. Cristiano Ronaldo, however, did not debut the Superfly II. Fulham winger Clint Dempsey debuted the boots on 18 March 2010 against Juventus in the UEFA Europa League at Craven Cottage. The second colourway is dark osbidian/white/cool mint. Cristiano Ronaldo also released his first signature boot. His Superfly's were in the White/Total Orange/Black colourway, featuring Nike's Safari print. Both the Superfly II and the Vapor VI were made available for pre-order on 22 March, and were released on 1 April 2010.
The third colorway of the Mercurial Vapor VI and Mercurial Vapor Superfly II is cactus/white/anthracite. This colorway was released on 1 August 2010.

The fourth colorway of the Mercurial Vapor VI came in Voltage Cherry/Obsidian/Silver. This colourway was released on 1 October 2010.

The fifth colorway of the Mercurial Vapor VI came in black/gray/orange. This colourway was released on 1 January 2011.

Mercurial Vapor VII and Mercurial Vapor Superfly III

Nike unveiled the third incarnation of the Superfly series – the Mercurial Vapor Superfly III – and the Mercurial Vapor VII on 16 March 2011. Both boots received two initial launch colourways: Plum Red/White/Volt and Marine Blue/Platinum/Orange.

This update of Nike's lightweight football boots transpired to be largely cosmetic; rather than any new innovations being added to the Mercurial Vapor and Superfly (as the Nike SENSE adaptive traction system was with the Superfly II), the sole, studs, last and weight all remained the same on both football boots.

The only change came in the form of a new graphical design on the upper, which was designed to make the boots even more visible on the pitch.

Whilst many players were seen training and playing in the new Mercurial Vapor boots in the preceding weeks, the Mercurial Vapor Superfly III received its official on-pitch debut on 19 March 2011, when Cristiano Ronaldo and Mesut Özil played in the Madrid derby.

Both of these football boots were released for retail on 1 April 2011.

On 14 April 2011, Nike revealed the Nike CR Mercurial Vapor Superfly III, a version of the Mercurial Vapor Superfly III to be worn exclusively by Cristiano Ronaldo. Whilst not featuring any technical updates to the standard Superfly III, the Nike CR Mercurial Vapor Superfly III features an all-over 'Safari' print in Black/Volt, and geometric pattern on the instep that differs to the standard Superfly III.

On November 17, 2011, it was announced on the Nike website that the new colorway version of the Vapor Superfly III was released. It comes in a Metallic Mech Blue/Solar Red-Dark Obsidian color.

Two more new colorway versions of the Vapor Superfly III were released. The Court Purple/Metallic Luster-Magenta was released late 2011, and the Trace Blue/Anthracite-Cyber, which is Cristiano Ronaldo's latest Nike Mercurial colorway, was released January 2012.

Mercurial Vapor VIII
On March 19, 2012, The Vapor VIII was released in Bright Mango/Dark Metallic Grey and Sail/Soar/Challenge Red color way. Its debut came in the French ligue 2 player Christian Bosmediano. It was put on sale for the public on March 29, 2012. The latest Mercurial Vapor weighs in at 6.5oz. The special features of the boot is that Nike no longer uses the sense studs and four studs for the heel counter now Nike uses a whole new stud design for traction and two studs for the heel counter. This implant of the Mercurials do not include a carbon fibre soleplate, but instead uses the fibreglass soleplate Nike has been using for two years for the standard Vapors. Nike no longer uses Flywire but uses a thin layer of microfiber that has a suede finish, which is said to have been for control. Not only does the new Mercurials provide lightweight and traction, now it also provides control.

These boots have also been released in the Miracle, Glide, and Victory versions, all version III (three). Although it appears that all three of the lower versions have at least a little bit of fiberglass on their sole plate, except for the Victory versions, it is actually just a sticker to improve marketing ability. The sticker on Miracle version has a zig-zag design on the fiberglass, the Glide versions have a sticker down the middle of the sole plate, but with no design in it, and as mentioned before, the Victory version has no sticker on its soleplate. The Vapor VIII is worn by Juan Mata, Didier Drogba, Eden Hazard, Neymar, Paul Aguilar, Andrey Arshavin, Cristiano Ronaldo, Zlatan Ibrahimović, Alexandre Pato, Mesut Özil, Christian Eriksen and Theo Walcott, among others.

Mercurial Vapor IX
In early 2013 the Mercurial Vapor IX was released with Cristiano Ronaldo headlining the boot with his own personalized CR7 edition. The IX came out in a Sunset/Total Crimson/Volt and Fireberry/Red Plum/Electric colourways. The speed boot features a lightweight (less than 200 grams ) Teijin upper featuring both a golf ball dimpled synthetic and a leather finish for control at all speeds and contoured speed which delivers superior fit and complete lock-down. The synthetic used for the synthetic version is a very thin padded synthetic that offers better touch on the ball allowing control in high speeds. The midsole has a perforated sockliner with synthetic top cloth which mirrors your natural foot shape enhancing comfort and flexibility. The outsole features a full-length lightweight doubled layer fiberglass and TPU outsole (leather finish has single layer fire glass for forefoot) which offers explosive acceleration and enhances multi-directional grip. The boot is also part of the successful ACC collection by Nike which basically is an element of control in wet weather conditions. Finally the Synthetic finish weighs in around 6.9oz while the leather finish weighs in at 6.7oz. In May 2013 a limited edition 1998 Mercurial was unveiled in the current Vapor IX model where only 1,998 pairs will be sold to celebrate the 15 years of the Mercurial range and it features the same colourway as the 1998 Nike Mercurial worn by Ronaldo at the 1998 FIFA World Cup. The Nike Mercurial Vapor IX CR7 Galaxy Edition was unveiled on 21 October 2013 featuring a galaxy theme as a part of the CR7 line.

Mercurial Vapor X & Superfly IV
At a Nike Innovation Summit event in Madrid on 25 April 2014, Nike announced the next generation of Mercurial football boots; the Nike Mercurial Superfly IV.

Launched on-stage with Cristiano Ronaldo, the Superfly IV marked the return of the "Superfly" name in football after a two-generation absence.

The main change in the boot's design is the inclusion of FlyKnit; of which a triple-weave blend is used to make the material suitable for football. An ACC coating is also implemented as with other Nike statement boots. Cristiano Ronaldo wears a modified pair.

A Dynamic Fit Collar is also used, as with the Magista Obra, in place of a traditional tongue to create a more snug fit and less disparity between boot and foot.

An all-new traction plate was also introduced, with a carbon fibre chassis for improved energy return.

The boot launches in a Hyper Punch/Gold/Volt colourway, with a Black/Silver/Hyperpunch alternative available.

Similar versions
The Nike Mercurial Vapor can be available in other versions, for different types of turf.

See also
 Nike Tiempo range, Nike's 'Touch' boot
 Nike CTR360 range, Nike's 'Control' boot
 Nike Total 90 range, Nike's 'Power' boot
 Nike Hypervenom range

References

External links
 

Association football equipment
Mercurial Vapor
Mercurial Vapor